Dozdak or Dezdak or Dazdak may refer to:
 Dozdak-e Olya, Chaharmahal and Bakhtiari Province
 Dozdak-e Sofla, Chaharmahal and Bakhtiari Province
 Dozdak-e Kuchek, Fars Province
 Dazdak, Gilan
 Dozdak, Lahijan, Gilan Province
 Dezdak, Kohgiluyeh, Kohgiluyeh and Boyer-Ahmad Province
 Dozdak, Dana, Kohgiluyeh and Boyer-Ahmad Province
 Dozdak, Nowshahr, Mazandaran Province
 Dozdak, Sari, Mazandaran Province

See also
 Dezg (disambiguation)
 Dozak (disambiguation)